Iskush (İsquş) is a rural locality (a selo) in Mayadykovsky Selsoviet, Dyurtyulinsky District, Bashkortostan, Russia. The population was 8 as of 2010. There are 4 streets.

Geography 
Iskush is located 32 km north of Dyurtyuli (the district's administrative centre) by road. Uyady is the nearest rural locality.

References 

Rural localities in Dyurtyulinsky District